Batas Ko Ay Bala is a 1996 Philippine action film co-edited and directed by Augusto Salvador. The film stars Cesar Montano, Donita Rose, John Regala and Efren Reyes Jr.

Cast
 Cesar Montano as Guiller
 Donita Rose as Emma
 John Regala as Ringgo
 Efren Reyes Jr. as Alex
 Bob Soler as Mr. Wagner
 Dick Israel as Victor
 Robert Arevalo as Gen. Madamba
 Conrad Poe as Brando
 Jaime Fabregas as Atty. Morales
 Zandro Zamora as Col. Miranda
 Rolly Lapid as Col. Villar
 Johnny Vicar as Gilbert
 Rebecca Bautista as Arlene
 Anne Villegas as Victor's Wife
 Lara Morena as Rape Victim
 Kim delos Santos as Rape Victim
 May Rivera as Nurse
 Rene Hawkins as NARCOM Agent
 Efren Lapid as Police Sgt.
 Evelyn Vargas as Restaurant Manager
 Rolan Montes as Hostage Taker
 Ben Sagmit as Embalmer

Production
The film had a working title Buhay ang Kabayaran with Joey del Rosario initially at the helm. Donita Rose, who was an exclusive artist of Viva Films at the time, was given permission to star in this film with the help of Cesar Montano. By the time principal photography began, del Rosario backed out and was replaced by Augusto Salvador.

References

External links

1996 films
1996 action films
Filipino-language films
Films directed by Augusto Salvador
Megavision Films films
Philippine action films